Eursinge is a hamlet in the Dutch province of Drenthe. It is a part of the municipality of Midden-Drenthe and lies about 16 km northeast of Hoogeveen.

The statistical area "Eursinge", which can also include the surrounding countryside, has a population of around 60.

References

Midden-Drenthe
Populated places in Drenthe